George Gibson Galloway (22 February 1803 (date christened) – 29 August 1867) was an English cricketer. Galloway's batting style is unknown. He was born in Nottingham, and died there.

Galloway made his first-class debut for Nottingham Cricket Club (aka Nottinghamshire)] against Sussex in 1837. He made two further first-class appearances during the season for Nottingham, against Kent and Sussex. He also made a single first-class appearance in that season for the Gentlemen of Nottinghamshire against the Players of Nottinghamshire. In his four first-class appearances, Galloway scored 17 runs at an average of 2.83, with a high score of 11.

References

External links

1803 births
1867 deaths
English cricketers
Nottinghamshire cricketers
Gentlemen of Nottinghamshire cricketers
Cricketers from Nottingham
English cricketers of 1826 to 1863